Billabong Zoo is a  wildlife park and koala breeding centre located in Port Macquarie, New South Wales, Australia. It was opened in 1986, and features a wide variety of Australian and exotic animals.

History
The park was opened in 1986, and was a major breeding centre for koalas. Starting in 2005, new ownership of the park has seen it move from simply breeding koalas to a more common wildlife park.

Exhibits
The park contains a number of native and exotic animals.

 African lion
 Bare-nosed wombat
 Black-handed spider monkey
 Blue-and-gold macaw
 Blue-fronted amazon
 Bush stone-curlew
 Cheetah
 Common death adder
 Common marmoset
 Cotton-top tamarin
 Dingo
 Eastern grey kangaroo
 Eastern quoll
 Emu
 Fennec fox
 Fijian crested iguana
 Glossy black cockatoo
 Green and golden bell frog
 Green iguana
 Koala
 Little penguin
 Lumholtz's tree-kangaroo
 Meerkat
 Pygmy bearded dragon
 Red panda
 Red-necked wallaby
 Saltwater crocodile
 Snow leopard
 Southern cassowary
 Southern hairy-nosed wombat

Facilities

The park also contains picnic barbeques, gardens, and billabongs (small lakes) covered with water lilies and stocked with koi carp and a visiting speckled longfin eel. It also features a café in the main entrance building.

Education
The park has a number of education talks through the day including a koala photo session.

Conservation
The park breeds koalas to send to other zoos in the Australasian breeding program.

In 2011 the park joined the Zoo and Aquarium Association and has participated in a number of species management programs including koalas and snow leopards.

See also
 Taronga Zoo

References

External links

Zoos in New South Wales
1989 establishments in Australia
Mid North Coast
Zoos established in 1989